LiveCode Ltd. (formerly Runtime Revolution and Cross Worlds Computing) makes the LiveCode cross-platform development environment (formerly called Revolution) for creating applications that run on iOS, Microsoft Windows, Linux, macOS, Android and Browsers. It is similar to Apple's discontinued HyperCard.

History
LiveCode began as an expert IDE for MetaCard, a development environment and GUI toolkit originally developed for UNIX development and later ported to support Microsoft Windows and macOS compilation. Runtime Revolution Ltd acquired MetaCard in July 2003 and released subsequent versions under the Revolution brand.

MetaCard built on the success of its predecessor HyperCard. Both HyperCard and MetaCard utilized an English-like language that was arguably easier to learn than BASIC. Both RevTalk and HyperCard are development environments within the SmallTalk genre and have similar design attributes.

The language has been known by several names including Transcript, RevTalk and as of November 2010 "LiveCode".  The entire product including the IDE is now officially referred to as LiveCode. The iOS version is available as of December 2010, with the Android and server versions under development.

The company is supported by a number of investors, including Mike Markkula who originally invested in Apple Computer, Inc. in 1976 and brought that company to market.

On 11 November 2009 in San Francisco, the company officially launched version 4.0 of the Revolution programming language (renamed LiveCode in November 2010), officially bringing the revTalk language to the web.

In late 2009, the company launched the RunRev Partner Program giving all people programming in the LiveCode language the opportunity to work more closely with the core LiveCode development team. This provision of dedicated Technical Account Managers is part of the continued development of the LiveCode language and is designed to make it even more accessible.

See also
 LiveCode
 MetaCard
 HyperCard
 xTalk

References

External links
 
 Ten Thumbs Typing Tutor, a Runtime Revolution product (formerly Learn to Type released in 1995)
 LiveCode Hosting, a LiveCode hosting service

Companies established in 1998
Companies based in Edinburgh
Software companies of Scotland